The 2005 Giro d'Italia was the 88th edition of the cycle race, one of cycling's Grand Tours. The Giro began in Reggio Calabria with a prologue individual time trial on 7 May, and Stage 11 occurred on 19 May with a mountainous stage from Marostica. The race finished in Milan on 29 May. The winner of the race was Paolo Savoldelli.

Stage 11 
19 May 2005 — Marostica to Zoldo Alto, 

Already one kilometer after the start, Benoît Joachim raced away from the field. After about 100 kilometers, shortly after the first mountain standing which Joachim won, he was captured by the field. Twenty-six kilometers before the end, and following an attack by "Gibo" Simoni, Ivan Basso raced away with only very few riders able to keep up. Only Paolo Savoldelli, who had picked up a twenty seconds advantage on the descent and therefore was able to reserve strengths, could stand Basso's rhythm, and he beat the Varesian rider at the summit of Zoldo Alto. Simoni came up 21 seconds later, but defending champion Damiano Cunego lost around six minutes and was ruled out from the list of contenders.

Stage 12 
20 May 2005 — Alleghe to Rovereto, 

Alessandro Petacchi's efforts during winter, striving to gain ability in the mountains, paid off just as they had done in Milan–San Remo, enabling him to recover from the gruelous Dolomiti stage far better than any of his opponents, and the Italian from Fassa Bortolo sprinted to his second victory in this Giro.

Stage 13 
21 May 2005 — Mezzocorona to Urtijëi, 

Colombian Iván Parra won the stage in St. Ulrich by breaking ahead of his fellow breakaways on the previous climb. Spaniard Juanma Gárate, fourth in the 2004 Giro d'Italia, came in second. As for the GC, Ivan Basso, with gastrical problems, lost one minute and the maglia rosa to "Il Falco" Paolo Savoldelli.

Stage 14 
22 May 2005 — Neumarkt to Livigno, 

It was in this stage that Ivan Basso's illness was really going to take its toll. Upon the first gradients of the Stelvio Pass, Cima Coppi of this edition, the Team CSC rider was left behind and unable to react because of his health problems. He lost eighteen minutes to the other GC riders. Savoldelli lost time to Simoni and Di Luca, who arrived in Livigno 3' 15" later than Iván Parra, scored an impressive Dolomiti double.

Stage 15 
23 May 2005 — Villa di Tirano to Lissone, 

This stage, originally 205 kilometres long, was reduced to a length of 147 kilometres due to bad weather conditions at Forcola di Livigno, one of the mountain climbs that the peloton had to go through that day. Alessandro Petacchi, after the abandon of sprinters such as Baden Cooke, Robbie McEwen, Stuart O'Grady or Jaan Kirsipuu, had only Erik Zabel to challenge him, but the Italian's speed was too much for the veteran T-Mobile rider.

Stage 16 
25 May 2005 — Lissone to Varazze, 

After the second rest-day, the peloton did not want to spend too much energies on a flat stage, so it was easy for a break-away of eighteen men to gather an advantage of 10 minutes. Amongst these breakaways, there was Crédit Agricole rider Christophe Le Mével, who outpowered his fellow breakaways to notch up his first pro victory.

Stage 17 
26 May 2005 — Varazze to Limone Piemonte,

Stage 18 
27 May 2005 — Chieri to Turin,  (ITT)

Stage 19 
28 May 2005 — Savigliano to Sestriere,

Stage 20 
29 May 2005 — Albese con Cassano to Milan,

References 

2005 Giro d'Italia
Giro d'Italia stages